Ochyrotica koteka is a moth of the family Pterophoridae. It is found in Papua New Guinea.

The wingspan is about 14 mm. Adults have been recorded in March and April.

References

Moths described in 1992
Ochyroticinae